Raspberry Creek is a watercourse in Queensland, Australia, approximately 620 km northwest of the capital Brisbane.

References

Rivers of Queensland